Chiltoniidae is a family of amphipods, which contains the following genera:
Afrochiltonia K. H. Barnard, 1955
Arabunnachiltonia King, 2009
Austrochiltonia Hurley, 1958
Chiltonia Stebbing, 1899
Phreatochiltonia Zeidler, 1991
Wangiannachiltonia King, 2009

References

Gammaridea
Crustacean families